The 2005 Michigan Wolverines softball team was an American college softball team that represented the University of Michigan during the 2005 NCAA softball season. The Wolverines, led by head coach Carol Hutchins in her twenty-first season, played their home games at Alumni Field in Ann Arbor, Michigan. The Wolverines finished the season with a 65–7 record, setting a program record for wins. They competed in the Big Ten Conference, where the team finished first with a 15–2 conference record.

They won the 2005 Big Ten Conference softball tournament and qualified for the NCAA Division I softball tournament, reaching the postseason for the eleventh consecutive year. They defeated UCLA in three games in the finals of the 2005 Women's College World Series to win their first championship in program history. They became the first team in the Big Ten to win the Women's College World Series, and the first team east of the Mississippi River to win the NCAA Division I Softball championship.

Preseason 
The Wolverines were ranked No. 8 in the nation according to the USA Today/NFCA and No. 12 in the ESPN.com/USA Softball preseason poll, becoming the top-ranked Big Ten school in both listings.
Jessica Merchant and Nicole Motycka were both named to the USA Softball Collegiate Player of the Year preseason watch list.

Personnel

Roster

Coaches

Schedule 

! style="" | Regular Season
|- valign="top" 

|- align="center" bgcolor="#bbbbbb"
| February 11 || vs. Tennessee || || Stephanie L.C. ParkLas Vegas, NV || colspan=7| Postponed
|- align="center" bgcolor="#bbbbbb"
| February 11 || vs. UCF || || Stephanie L.C. Park || colspan=7| Postponed
|- align="center" bgcolor="#ffdddd"
| February 12 || vs. Baylor || No. 8 || Stephanie L.C. Park || 6–7 || Ferguson (4–0) || Motycka (0–1) || 417 || 0–1 || –
|- align="center" bgcolor="#ddffdd"
| February 12 || vs. UC Santa Barbara || No. 8 || Stephanie L.C. Park || 7–2 || Ritter (1–0) || Sommer (0–1) || — || 1–1 || –
|- align="center" bgcolor="#ddffdd"
| February 13 || vs. Utah || No. 8 || Stephanie L.C. Park || 7–1 || Motycka (1–1) || Nielsen (3–1) || 87 || 2–1 || –
|- align="center" bgcolor="#ddffdd"
| February 13 || vs. Oregon || No. 8 || Stephanie L.C. Park || 9–0 (5) || Ritter (2–0) || Cook (2–1) || — || 3–1 || –
|- align="center" bgcolor="#ddffdd"
| February 18 || vs. North Carolina State || No. 8 || FAU FieldBoca Raton, FL || 3–0 || Wilson (1–0) || Sims (4–1) || — || 4–1 || –
|- align="center" bgcolor="#ddffdd"
| February 18 || vs. Pittsburgh || No. 8 || FAU Field || 3–0 || Ritter (3–0) || Belardinelli (0–1) || — || 5–1 || –
|- align="center" bgcolor="#ddffdd"
| February 19 || vs. Rutgers || No. 8 || FAU Field || 8–0 (5) || Motycka (2–1) || Crosby (0–2) || 120 || 6–1 || –
|- align="center" bgcolor="#ddffdd"
| February 19 || vs. Florida Atlantic || No. 8 || FAU Field || 12–3 (6) || Ritter (4–0) || Freel (3–3) || 128 || 7–1 || –
|- align="center" bgcolor="#ddffdd"
| February 20 || vs. Florida Atlantic || No. 8 || FAU Field || 9–1 (5) || Wilson (3–0) || Freel (3–4) || 119 || 8–1 || –
|- align="center" bgcolor="#ddffdd"
| February 25 || vs. South Carolina || No. 8 || South CommonsColumbus, GA || 9–3 || Motycka (3–1) || Pouliot (0–2) || — || 9–1 || –
|- align="center" bgcolor="#ddffdd"
| February 25 || vs. No. 13 Georgia Tech || No. 8 || South Commons || 4–1 || Ritter (5–0) || Sallinger (8–1) || — || 10–1 || –
|- align="center" bgcolor="#ddffdd"
| February 26 || vs. Southern Illinois || No. 8 || South Commons || 3–0 || Wilson (3–0) || Harre (1–4) || — || 11–1 || –
|- align="center" bgcolor="#ddffdd"
| February 26 || vs. Creighton || No. 8 || South Commons || 7–0 || Motycka (4–1) || Nielsen (4–2) || — || 12–1 || –
|- align="center" bgcolor="#bbbbbb"
| February 27 || vs. No. 21 Florida State || No. 8 || South Commons || colspan=7| Postponed
|- align="center" bgcolor="#bbbbbb"
| February 27 || Championship Game || No. 8 || South Commons || colspan=7| Postponed
|-

|- align="center" bgcolor="#ddffdd"
| March 1 || at No. 15 Florida || No. 8 || Florida Softball StadiumGainesville, FL || 4–0 || Ritter (6–0) || Stevens (5–4) || — || 13–1 || –
|- align="center" bgcolor="#ddffdd"
| March 1 || at No. 15 Florida || No. 8 || Florida Softball Stadium || 4–1 || Wilson (4–0) || Knowles (3–1) || — || 14–1 || –
|- align="center" bgcolor="#ddffdd"
| March 2 || at UCF || No. 8 || UCF Softball ComplexOrlando, FL || 4–1 || Ritter (7–0) || Enders (6–6) || 58 || 15–1 || –
|- align="center" bgcolor="#ddffdd"
| March 2 || at UCF || No. 8 || UCF Softball Complex || 7–0 || Wilson (5–0) || McIntyre (6–1) || 78 || 16–1 || –
|- align="center" bgcolor="#ddffdd"
| March 4 || vs. Tennessee Chattanooga || No. 7 || USF Softball FieldTampa, FL || 2–1 (8) || Wilson (6–0) || Swarthout (5–5) || — || 17–1 || –
|- align="center" bgcolor="#ddffdd"
| March 4 || at South Florida || No. 7 || USF Softball Field || 9–0 (5) || Ritter (8–0) || Urbanik (5–4) || — || 18–1 || –
|- align="center" bgcolor="#ddffdd"
| March 5 || vs. Temple || No. 7 || USF Softball Field || 4–0 || Wilson (7–0) || Nacianceno (0–1) || — || 19–1 || –
|- align="center" bgcolor="#ddffdd"
| March 5 || vs. No. 16 Florida || No. 7 || USF Softball Field || 6–2 || Ritter (9–0) || Stevens (6–4) || — || 20–1 || –
|- align="center" bgcolor="#ddffdd"
| March 6 || vs. Pittsburgh || No. 7 || USF Softball Field || 9–0 (5) || Wilson (8–0) || Belardinelli (2–5) || — || 21–1 || –
|- align="center" bgcolor="#ddffdd"
| March 17 || at Cal State Fullerton || No. 5 || Titans Softball ComplexFullerton, CA || 3–2 || Wilson (9–0) || Weekley (1–1) || — || 22–1 || –
|- align="center" bgcolor="#ddffdd"
| March 17 || vs. No. 24 Fresno State || No. 5 || Titans Softball Complex || 6–0 || Ritter (10–0) || Nesbitt (3–2) || — || 23–1 || –
|- align="center" bgcolor="#ddffdd"
| March 18 || vs. North Carolina || No. 5 || Titans Softball Complex || 5–0 || Wilson (10–0) || Cox (7–8) || — || 24–1 || –
|- align="center" bgcolor="#ddffdd"
| March 19 || vs. DePaul || No. 5 || Titans Softball Complex || 1–0 || Ritter (11–0) || Huitnik (3–7) || — || 25–1 || –
|- align="center" bgcolor="#ddffdd"
| March 20 || vs. No. 11 Texas || No. 4 || Titans Softball Complex || 7–0 || Wilson (11–0) || Bradford (7–1) || — || 26–1 || –
|- align="center" bgcolor="#ddffdd"
| March 20 || vs. No. 1 Arizona || No. 5 || Titans Softball Complex || 6–2 || Ritter (12–0) || Mowatt (7–1) || 1,209 || 27–1 || –
|- align="center" bgcolor="#ddffdd"
| March 25 || vs. Western Kentucky || No. 1 || Ulmer StadiumLouisville, KY || 2–0 || Ritter (13–0) || Schwartz (3–5) || 272 || 28–1 || –
|- align="center" bgcolor="#ddffdd"
| March 25 || vs. Middle Tennessee || No. 1 || Ulmer Stadium || 17–1 (5) || Motycka (5–1) || Dorais (0–2) || 272 || 29–1 || –
|- align="center" bgcolor="#ddffdd"
| March 26 || at Louisville || No. 1 || Ulmer Stadium || 2–1 || Wilson (12–0) || Sherman (6–7) || — || 30–1 || –
|- align="center" bgcolor="#ddffdd"
| March 26 || at Louisville || No. 1 || Ulmer Stadium || 7–0 || Ritter (14–0) || Bishop (10–5) || — || 31–1 || –
|- align="center" bgcolor="#ddffdd"
| March 30 || at Bowling Green || No. 1 || BGSU Softball FieldBowling Green, OH || 6–0 || Wilson (13–0) || Vrabel (6–8) || 427 || 32–1 || –
|-

|- align="center" bgcolor="#ffdddd"
| April 1 || No. 24 Iowa || No. 1 || Alumni FieldAnn Arbor, MI || 2–5 || Birocci (17–4) || Wilson (13–1) || 1,237 || 32–2 || 0–1
|- align="center" bgcolor="#ddffdd"
| April 2 || No. 24 Iowa || No. 1 || Alumni Field || 3–1 || Ritter (15–0) || Birocci (17–5) || 485 || 33–2 || 1–1
|- align="center" bgcolor="#ddffdd"
| April 3 || Illinois || No. 1 || Alumni Field || 8–7 || Ritter (16–0) || DeVreese (3–6) || — || 34–2 || 2–1
|- align="center" bgcolor="#ddffdd"
| April 3 || |Illinois || No. 1 || Alumni Field || 10–0 (5) || Wilson (14–1) || DeVreese (3–7) || 783 || 35–2 || 3–1
|- align="center" bgcolor="#ffdddd"
| April 6 || at Central Michigan || No. 1 || CMU Softball ComplexMount Pleasant, MI || 4–5 || DeRoche (3–1) || Wilson (14–2) || — || 35–3 || 3–1
|- align="center" bgcolor="#ddffdd"
| April 6 || at Central Michigan || No. 1 || CMU Softball Complex || 7–3 || Wilson (15–2) || DeRoche (3–2) || — || 36–3 || 3–1
|- align="center" bgcolor="#ddffdd"
| April 8 || at Wisconsin || No. 1 || Goodman DiamondMadison, WI || 3–2 (8) || Wilson (16–2) || Brock (9–5) || — || 37–3 || 4–1
|- align="center" bgcolor="#ddffdd"
| April 9 || at Wisconsin || No. 1 || Goodman Diamond || 8–0 (6) || Wilson (17–2) || Layne (2–5) || — || 38–3 || 5–1
|- align="center" bgcolor="#ddffdd"
| April 10 || at Minnesota || No. 1 || Jane Sage CowlesMinneapolis, MN || 4–0 || Ritter (17–0) || Peyer (10–11) || — || 39–3 || 6–1
|- align="center" bgcolor="#ddffdd"
| April 10 || at Minnesota || No. 1 || Jane Sage Cowles || 11–0 (5) || Wilson (18–2) || Peyer (10–12) || 356 || 40–3 || 7–1
|- align="center" bgcolor="#ddffdd"
| April 15 || at Purdue || No. 1 || Varsity SB ComplexWest Lafayette, IN || 3–0 || Ritter (18–0) || Baker (13–10) || — || 41–3 || 8–1
|- align="center" bgcolor="#ddffdd"
| April 16 || at Purdue || No. 1 || Varsity SB Complex || 6–2 || Ritter (19–0) || LaRiva (9–3) || — || 42–3 || 9–1
|- align="center" bgcolor="#ddffdd"
| April 17 || at Indiana || No. 1 || IU Softball ComplexBloomington, IN || 9–0 (5) || Ritter (20–0) || Roark (9–16) || 275 || 43–3 || 10–1
|- align="center" bgcolor="#ddffdd"
| April 17 || at Indiana || No. 1 || IU Softball Complex || 10–2 (6) || Ritter (21–0) || Bogado (1–7) || 240 || 44–3 || 11–1
|- align="center" bgcolor="#ddffdd"
| April 19 || Eastern Michigan || No. 1 || Alumni Field || 5–1 || Wilson (19–2) || Woodrum (6–7) || — || 45–3 || 11–1
|- align="center" bgcolor="#ddffdd"
| April 19 || Eastern Michigan || No. 1 || Alumni Field || 14–2 (5) || Ritter (22–0) || Woodrum (6–8) || 743 || 46–3 || 11–1
|- align="center" bgcolor="#ffdddd"
| April 22 || Penn State || No. 1 || Alumni Field || 1–2 || Esparza (10–3) || Ritter (22–1) || 515 || 46–4 || 11–2
|- align="center" bgcolor="#bbbbbb"
| April 23 || Penn State || No. 1 || Alumni Field || colspan=7| Postponed
|- align="center" bgcolor="#bbbbbb"
| April 24 || Ohio State || No. 1 || Alumni Field || colspan=7| Postponed
|- align="center" bgcolor="#bbbbbb"
| April 24 || Ohio State || No. 1 || Alumni Field || colspan=7| Postponed
|-

|- align="center" bgcolor="#ddffdd"
| May 1 || Michigan State || No. 1 || Alumni Field || 8–0 (5) || Ritter (23–1) || Turney (12–14) || 1,903 || 47–4 || 12–2
|- align="center" bgcolor="#ddffdd"
| May 1 || Michigan State || No. 1 || Alumni Field || 9–1 (5) || Ritter (24–1) || Turney (12–15) || 1,903 || 48–4 || 13–2
|- align="center" bgcolor="#ddffdd"
| May 4 || Western Michigan || No. 1 || Alumni Field || 2–0 || Wilson (20–2) || VanDerSlik (10–14) || — || 49–4 || 13–2
|- align="center" bgcolor="#ddffdd"
| May 4 || Western Michigan || No. 1 || Alumni Field || 5–0 || Ritter (25–1) || Shumaker (4–1) || 503 || 50–4 || 13–2
|- align="center" bgcolor="#ddffdd"
| May 7 || No. 19 Northwestern || No. 1 || Alumni Field || 3–0 || Ritter (26–1) || Canney (18–6) || 1,858 || 51–4 || 14–2
|- align="center" bgcolor="#ddffdd"
| May 8 || No. 19 Northwestern || No. 1 || Alumni Field || 8–7 || Wilson (21–2) || Canney (18–7) || 1,657 || 52–4 || 15–2
|-

|-
! style="" | Postseason
|-

|-
|- align="center" bgcolor="#ddffdd"
| May 12 || Michigan State (8) || No. 1 (1) || Alumni Field || 6–2 || Ritter (27–1) || Turney (14–16) || 1,203 || 53–4 || 1–0
|- align="center" bgcolor="#bbbbbb"
| May 13 || Wisconsin (5) || No. 1 (1) || Alumni Field || colspan=7| Postponed
|- align="center" bgcolor="#ddffdd"
| May 14 || Wisconsin (5) || No. 1 (1) || Alumni Field || 10–1 (5) || Wilson (22–2) || Brock (20–9) || — || 54–4 || 2–0
|- align="center" bgcolor="#ddffdd"
| May 14 || No. 22 Iowa (3) || No. 1 (1) || Alumni Field || 7–2 || Ritter (28–1) || Arnold (20–5) || 1,113 || 55–4 || 3–0
|-

|-
|- align="center" bgcolor="#ddffdd"
| May 20 || Canisius || No. 1 (1) || Alumni Field || 8–1 || Ritter (29–1) || Bunten (13–11) || 1,837 || 56–4 || 1–0
|- align="center" bgcolor="#ddffdd"
| May 21 || Seton Hall || No. 1 (1) || Alumni Field || 5–0 || Ritter (30–1) || Meyer (27–6) || 1,457 || 57–4 || 2–0
|- align="center" bgcolor="#ddffdd"
| May 22 || North Carolina || No. 1 (1) || Alumni Field || 6–0 || Ritter (31–1) || Cox (22–20) || 1,046 || 58–4 || 3–0
|-

|-
|- align="center" bgcolor="#ddffdd"
| May 27 || No. 21 Washington (16) || No. 1 (1) || Alumni Field || 4–1 || Ritter (32–1) || Boek (20–13) || 2,311 || 59–4 || 1–0
|- align="center" bgcolor="#ffdddd"
| May 28 || No. 21 Washington (16) || No. 1 (1) || Alumni Field || 2–3 || Noble (15–8) || Ritter (32–2) || 2,426 || 59–5 || 1–1
|- align="center" bgcolor="#ddffdd"
| May 28 || No. 21 Washington (16) || No. 1 (1) || Alumni Field || 11–2 (6) || Ritter (33–2) || Boek (20–14) || 2,426 || 60–5 || 2–1
|-

|-
|- align="center" bgcolor="#ddffdd"
| June 2 || vs. No. 23 DePaul || No. 1 (1) || ASA Hall of Fame StadiumOklahoma City, OK || 3–0 || Ritter (34–2) || Adix (23–9) || 4,245 || 61–5 || 1–0
|- align="center" bgcolor="#ddffdd"
| June 2 || vs. No. 5 Texas (4) || No. 1 (1) || ASA Hall of Fame Stadium || 4–0 || Ritter (35–2) || Osterman (29–7) || 4,560 || 62–5 || 2–0
|- align="center" bgcolor="#ffdddd"
| June 5 || vs. No. 11 Tennessee (11) || No. 1 (1) || ASA Hall of Fame Stadium || 0–2 (11) || Abbott (50–8) || Ritter (35–3) || 4,236 || 62–6 || 2–1
|- align="center" bgcolor="#ddffdd"
| June 5 || vs. No. 11 Tennessee (11) || No. 1 (1) || ASA Hall of Fame Stadium || 3–2 || Ritter (36–3) || Abbott (50–9) || 2,431 || 63–6 || 3–1
|- align="center" bgcolor="#ffdddd"
| June 6 || vs. No. 12 UCLA (7) || No. 1 (1) || ASA Hall of Fame Stadium || 0–5 || Selden (29–12) || Ritter (36–4) || 4,161 || 63–7 || 3–2
|- align="center" bgcolor="#ddffdd"
| June 7 || vs. No. 12 UCLA (7) || No. 1 (1) || ASA Hall of Fame Stadium || 5–2 || Ritter (37–4) || Selden (29–13) || 4,161 || 64–7 || 4–2
|- align="center" bgcolor="#ddffdd"
| June 8 || vs. No. 12 UCLA (7) || No. 1 (1) || ASA Hall of Fame Stadium || 4–1 (10) || Ritter (38–4) || Selden (29–14) || 4,032 || 65–7 || 5–2
|-

|-
|- style="text-align:center;"
|

Ranking movement

Records and accomplishments

Individual records

Offense 
 Most home runs in a season: 21 (Samantha Findlay and Jessica Merchant)
 Most hits in a season: 91 (Tiffany Haas)
 Most runs scored in a season: 67 (Jessica Merchant)
 Most RBI in a season: 77 (Samantha Findlay)
 Most at bats in a season: 253 (Tiffany Haas)
 Most home runs in a game: 3 (Samantha Findlay, April 17, 2005, tied with Nicole Motycka)
 Most runs in a game: 4 (Samantha Findlay, April 17, 2005, tied with seven other players)

Pitching 
 Most appearances in a season: 48 (Jennie Ritter, tied with Kelly Holmes)
 Most starts in a season: 41 (Jennie Ritter, tied with Kelly Holmes)
 Most complete games in a season: 34 (Jennie Ritter)
 Most innings pitched in a season:  innings (Jennie Ritter)
 Most wins in a season: 38 (Jennie Ritter)
 Most strikeouts in a season: 417 (Jennie Ritter)
 Most no-hitters in a season: 3 (Jennie Ritter, tied with Vicki Morrow)

Team records 
 Most wins in a season: 65
 Most consecutive wins: 32 (February 13, 2005 to March 30, 2005)

Accomplishments 
 First victory over a top-ranked opponent (6–2 victory over No. 1 Arizona on March 20).
 First No. 1 national ranking (March 22).
 First No. 1 seed in the NCAA tournament.
 Samantha Findlay became the first freshman position player to be named Women's College World Series Most Outstanding Player.

Awards and honors

References 

Michigan
Michigan Wolverines softball team
Michigan
Big Ten Conference softball champion seasons
Michigan Wolverines softball seasons
NCAA Division I softball tournament seasons
Women's College World Series seasons